Bellissima is a 1951 Italian comedy film directed by Luchino Visconti and starring Anna Magnani, Walter Chiari and Tecla Scarano.

Plot
Bellissima centers on a working-class mother in Rome, Maddalena, who drags her young daughter to Cinecittà Studios to attend an audition for a new film by Alessandro Blasetti. Maddalena's efforts to promote her daughter grow increasingly frenzied.

Cast
Anna Magnani as Maddalena Cecconi
Walter Chiari as Alberto Annovazzi
Tina Apicella as Maria Cecconi
Gastone Renzelli as Spartaco Cecconi
Tecla Scarano as Tilde Spernanzoni
Lola Braccini as the photographer's wife
Arturo Bragaglia as the photographer
Nora Ricci as the laundry girl
Vittorina Benvenuti
Linda Sini as Mimmetta
Teresa Battaggi as a mother
Gisella Monaldi as a concierge
Amalia Pellegrini
Corrado Mantoni as radio announcer

Production
Alessandro Blasetti, a contemporary film director, appears as himself. Keeping in with the tradition of Italian neorealism a number of roles went to members of the public. Magnani played a part in their selection, approving of Gastone Renzelli a butcher who was cast as her husband.

The film's sets were designed by Gianni Polidori. It was shot at the Cinecittà Studios, which appear prominently in the film. It was not a box office success.

Awards
 Nastro d'Argento for Best Actress Anna Magnani

References

Bibliography
 Gundle, Stephen. Fame Amid the Ruins: Italian Film Stardom in the Age of Neorealism. Berghahn Books, 2019.

External links
 

1951 films
1951 comedy-drama films
Italian comedy-drama films
Italian neorealist films
1950s Italian-language films
Italian black-and-white films
Films set in Rome
Films directed by Luchino Visconti
Films with screenplays by Suso Cecchi d'Amico
Films with screenplays by Cesare Zavattini
Films shot at Cinecittà Studios
1950s Italian films